Liam J. Hallam-Eames (born 20 August 1995) is a New Zealand rugby union player. His playing position is lock. He was named as a late inclusion in the Crusaders squad for Round 12 of the 2022 Super Rugby Pacific season. He made his Super Rugby debut in the same match. He was also a member of the  2021 Bunnings NPC squad.

References

External links
itsrugby.co.uk profile

New Zealand rugby union players
Living people
Rugby union locks
Manawatu rugby union players
Jersey Reds players
Auckland rugby union players
Northland rugby union players
Crusaders (rugby union) players
1995 births
New Orleans Gold players